The Grove of the Caesars is  a historical novel by British writer Lindsey Davis, the eighth  in her Flavia Albia series. It was published in the UK by Hodder & Stoughton on 2 April 2020 .

The story is set in 1st century Rome, in and around the gardens beyond the Tiber, and features a serial killer, a buried collection of ancient scrolls, a shipwreck, a sad pair of dancing boys and much else. It reflects on the follies of the world of antiquarian scroll-collecting, with special reference to the writer Didymus Dodomos, described in the list of characters as "a ghastly horticulturalist, ghost-written".

References

External links
Lindsey Davis talks about The Grove of the Caesars, 28 March 2020 50 minute video

Novels set in ancient Rome
British historical novels
Flavia Albia novels
2020 British novels
21st-century British novels
Hodder & Stoughton books
Novels set in the 1st century
St. Martin's Press books